GCJ may refer to:
 GCJ-02, a geodetic datum used in China
 General Council of the Judiciary, the constitutional body governing the Judiciary of Spain
 GNU Compiler for Java
 Grand Central Airport, in Midrand, South Africa
 Knight Grand Commander of the Order of Saint Joachim